Serrekunda United Football Club is a football club from the town of Serrekunda in the West African, state of Gambia. They currently play in the GFA League Third Division. 
they were promoted to the GFA League First Division, for the 2015 season.

References

External links
Soccerway – Gambia 2015 season
Football clubs in the Gambia